The One Day by Donald Hall is a book-length poem.

Synopsis
The book is composed of three parts--"Shrubs Burnt Away," "Four Classic Texts" and "To Build a House", employing a 10-line stanza with variable line length in an experimental form. It centers on mid-life anxiety, using phrases like "a preparation of death." It is not completely dark and despairing, as it focuses on how to make a life worth living, instructing readers to: "Work, love, build a house, and die. But build a house."

Awards and Acclaim
 Winner of the National Book Critics Circle Award in Poetry (1988)
 "Its passion and urgency are rare and remarkable." - The Washington Post
 "...the concept of middle age is explored with fresh insight and expressed in brilliant turns of phrase." - Publishers Weekly.

External links
The One Day - Amazon
Donald Hall - Biography Poetry Foundation
Academy of American Poets

American poems
1988 books
Mariner Books books